Víctor Alfonso Guazá Lucumí (born August 16, 1985) is a Colombian retired footballer.

In 2016, he suffered a Skull fracture. He made a full recovery and continued playing.

References

External links
 Profile at BDFA 
 

1985 births
Living people
Colombian footballers
Atlético Huila footballers
UA Maracaibo players
Deportivo Miranda F.C. players
La Equidad footballers
Universidad Técnica de Cajamarca footballers
Zob Ahan Esfahan F.C. players
Boyacá Chicó F.C. footballers
Carlos A. Mannucci players
Categoría Primera A players
Peruvian Primera División players
Venezuelan Primera División players
Persian Gulf Pro League players
Colombian expatriate footballers
Expatriate footballers in Venezuela
Colombian expatriate sportspeople in Venezuela
Expatriate footballers in Peru
Colombian expatriate sportspeople in Peru
Expatriate footballers in Iran
Colombian expatriate sportspeople in Iran
Association football forwards
Sportspeople from Cauca Department